Sayavush Hasan oglu Hasanov (20 January 1964 – 25 June 1992) was an Azerbaijanian soldier and construction worker who received the National Hero of Azerbaijan award. He was born on 20 January 1964 in the Yengicə village, Sharur District of Nakhchivan Autonomous Republic of Azerbaijan.

Biography

Early life

Azerbaijanian independence 
When voluntary defense battalions were established to protect Garabagh, Sayavush was one of the first ones to join. He fought in many regions of Azerbaijan—Gazakh, Gedebey, Goranboy, Shusha—and performed all the assigned tasks adequately. On 25 June 1992, his battalion was ordered to liberate Girmizikend village from enemy occupation. While the battalion was advancing into the village, they were subjected to heavy fire. The group strengthened its position, and they quickly began to repel attacks, but Sayavush died in the battle. A week later, his body was removed from the battlefield.

Family 
He was married.

Awards

He was posthumously awarded the title of National Hero of Azerbaijan by the 69th decree of the president of the Azerbaijan Republic on 21 July 1992.

He was buried in the Alley of Martyrs in Baku.

References

External links
THE KOREA HERALD: Azerbaijan remembers ‘Black January’ massacre
ITV kanalı. Milli Qəhrəman.
Vüqar Əsgərov. Azərbaycanın Milli Qəhrəmanları. (Yenidən işlənmiş II nəşr). Bakı: "Dərələyəz-M", 2010, səh. 114–115.

1964 births
1992 deaths
Azerbaijani military personnel
Azerbaijani military personnel of the Nagorno-Karabakh War
Azerbaijani military personnel killed in action
National Heroes of Azerbaijan
People from Sharur District